The Central District of Chardavol County is a district (bakhsh) in Chardavol County, Ilam Province, Iran. At the 2006 census, its population was 41,034, in 8,461 families.  The District has two cities: Sarableh and Asemanabad.  The District has two rural districts (dehestan): Asemanabad Rural District and Bijnavand Rural District.

References 

Districts of Ilam Province
Chardavol County